Myrtle is a community in the Town of Whitby, Durham Region, Ontario, Canada.

Myrtle, located in what was Whitby Township, was first named Well's Corners. In 1856, the name of the community was changed to Wellwood and again to Myrtle in the 1860s. In 1968, Myrtle became part of the Town of Whitby when the Town amalgamated with Whitby Township.  

Myrtle is located approximately 16 kilometres north of the town centre of Whitby and 6 kilometres north of Brooklin along Highway 12.

References
 Rayburn, Alan.  Place Names of Ontario.   Toronto : University of Toronto Press, 1997.  .

External links 
 Historic Photos of Myrtle, Ontario at Whitby Public Library and Archives Digital Collection
Myrtle at Geographical Names of Canada

Neighbourhoods in Whitby, Ontario